The RMS Norham Castle was a Royal Mail Ship and passenger liner of the Union-Castle Line in service between London, England and Cape Town, South Africa between 1883 and 1903. 

In her first year the ship was in the Java Sea in the western Pacific Ocean when the island of Krakatoa exploded in August 1883. A series of eruptions emitted vast quantities of smoke and ash and plunged the area into darkness, and waves destroyed a lighthouse and other structures. Shortly after 10:00 in the morning of 27 August the final explosion destroyed the island with a blast that was heard and felt thousands of miles away. The pressure wave from that blast ruptured the eardrums of over half of the crew of Norham Castle. 

In 1897 the ship was reviewed by Queen Victoria at Spithead during her Diamond Jubilee celebration, and was later used by the Prince of Wales when he started a grand yacht race from her deck.  Also, in April 1897, Sir Alfred Milner traveled aboard the Norham Castle from Southampton to Cape Town, to take up the reigns as the new High Commissioner of South Africa.

The ship was sold to the French line Compagnie Générale Transatlantique (General Transatlantic Company) in 1903, and renamed the Martinique. She served the Bordeaux, France-West Indies route until 1931.

Footnotes

References
 Hodson, Norman, The Race to the Cape: A Story of the Union-Castle Line, 1857-1977, Hampshire: Navigator, 1995
 Wrench, John Evelyn, Alfred Lord Milner: The Man of No Illusions, London: Eyre & Spottiswoode, 1958
 Marlowe, John, Milner: Apostle of Empire, London: Hamish Hamilton, 1976 
 O'Brien, Terence, "Milner: Viscount Milner of St. James's and Cape Town", London: Constable, 1979

External links

 Nomenclature: Link
 History of the ship: Link

1883 ships